|}

The Prix d'Aumale is a Group 3 flat horse race in France open to two-year-old thoroughbred fillies. It is run at Chantilly over a distance of 1,600 metres (about 1 mile), and it is scheduled to take place each year in September.

History
The earliest version of the Prix d'Aumale was established in 1835. It was staged at Chantilly until the end of the July Monarchy in 1848.

The present event is named after Henri d'Orléans (1822–1897), who inherited the title Duc d'Aumale. Upon his death the Duc bequeathed his Chantilly estate, including the racecourse and the château, to the Institut de France.

The modern Prix d'Aumale was introduced in 1921. It originally took place at Chantilly, and was contested by horses of either gender.

The event was abandoned during World War II, with no running from 1940 to 1945. In the post-war years it was held at Longchamp (1946–47, 1949–51, 1955), Chantilly (1948) and Deauville (1952–54). It began a longer spell at Chantilly in 1956.

The race was restricted to fillies and transferred to Longchamp in 1966. It was not run from 1969 to 1971, and resumed at Longchamp in 1972. It returned to Chantilly in 1973, and was given Group 3 status in 1979.

Since the 1970s, the venue of the Prix d'Aumale has been switched between Chantilly (1973–82, 1997–2001, 2004–09, 2012–17) and Longchamp (1983–96, 2002–03, 2010–11, 2018–2020).

Records
Leading jockey (6 wins):
 Rae Johnstone – Ninon (1934), Bland Caress (1935), Balaton (1946), Amour Drake (1948), Pharsale (1950), Chateau Latour (1955)
 Roger Poincelet – Noory (1952), Beigler Bey (1953), Iadwiga (1958), Tapageur (1962), Neptunus (1963), Ailes du Chant (1966)

Leading trainer (6 wins):
 François Boutin – Antrona (1975), Play It Safe (1981), Air Distingue (1982), Coup de Folie (1984), Mackla (1989), Ghostly (1994)
 André Fabre – Kindergarten (1992), Bonash (1993), Anna Palariva	(1997), Shahah (2014), Savarin (2019), Fleur D'Iris	(2021)

Leading owner (4 wins):
 Jean Stern – White Wing (1922), Arpette (1932), Amalaric (1933), Star (1960)

Winners since 1979

Earlier winners

 1921: Zariba
 1922: White Wing
 1923: Doddles
 1924: Pervencheres
 1925: Diplomate
 1926: Fairy Legend
 1927: Cestona
 1928: Negron
 1929: Diademe
 1930: Taraskoia
 1931: Shelley
 1932: Arpette
 1933: Amalaric
 1934: Ninon
 1935: Bland Caress
 1936: May Wong
 1937: Castel Fusano
 1938: Ravioli
 1939: Lighthouse
 1940–45: no race
 1946: Balaton
 1947:
 1948: Amour Drake
 1949: Nuit de Folies
 1950: Pharsale
 1951: Faubourg
 1952: Noory
 1953: Beigler Bey
 1954: Soleil Royal
 1955: Chateau Latour
 1956: Jabot
 1957: Yla
 1958: Iadwiga
 1959: Drago
 1960: Star
 1961: Hodell
 1962: Tapageur
 1963: Neptunus
 1964: Prince du Vent
 1965: Nasambi
 1966: Ailes du Chant
 1967: Ortanique
 1968: Kerande
 1969–71: no race
 1972: Amira
 1973: Tropical Cream
 1974: Seventh Heaven
 1975: Antrona
 1976: Proud Event
 1977: Pink Valley
 1978: Dunette

See also
 List of French flat horse races

References
 France Galop / Racing Post:

 france-galop.com – A Brief History: Prix d'Aumale.
 galopp-sieger.de – Prix d'Aumale.
 horseracingintfed.com – International Federation of Horseracing Authorities – Prix d'Aumale (2016).
 pedigreequery.com – Prix d'Aumale.

Flat horse races for two-year-old fillies
Chantilly Racecourse
Horse races in France
Recurring sporting events established in 1921